Yuran Nimasha (born 18 December 1998) is a Sri Lankan cricketer. He made his first-class debut for Colombo Cricket Club in the 2018–19 Premier League Tournament on 31 January 2019. He made his List A debut on 3 November 2021, for Burgher Recreation Club in the 2021–22 Major Clubs Limited Over Tournament.

References

External links
 

1998 births
Living people
Sri Lankan cricketers
Burgher Recreation Club cricketers
Colombo Cricket Club cricketers
Place of birth missing (living people)